Plymouth is a rural town in Grafton County, New Hampshire, United States, in the White Mountains Region. It has a unique role as the economic, medical, commercial, and cultural center for the predominantly rural Plymouth, NH Labor Market Area. Plymouth is located at the confluence of the Pemigewasset and Baker rivers and sits at the foot of the White Mountains. The town's population was 6,682 at the 2020 census. It is home to Plymouth State University, Speare Memorial Hospital, and Plymouth Regional High School.

The town's main center, where 4,730 people resided at the 2020 census (three-quarters of whom are college student age), is defined as the Plymouth census-designated place (CDP), and is located along U.S. Route 3, south of the confluence of the Baker and Pemigewasset rivers.

Plymouth State University, in the center of town, has an undergraduate class size of 4,000 students and a graduate class size of 1,000 students.

History 
Plymouth was originally the site of an Abenaki village that was burned to the ground by Captain Thomas Baker in 1712. This was just one of the many British raids on American Indian settlements during Queen Anne's War. Part of a large plot of undivided land in the Pemigewasset Valley, the town was first named "New Plymouth", after the original Plymouth Colony in Massachusetts. Colonial Governor Benning Wentworth granted Plymouth to settlers from Hollis, all of whom had been soldiers in the French and Indian War. Some had originally come from Plymouth, Massachusetts. The town was incorporated in 1763. Parts of Hebron and Campton were annexed in 1845 and 1860.

In 1806, then-lawyer Daniel Webster lost his first criminal case at the Plymouth courthouse, which now houses the Historical Society. The author Nathaniel Hawthorne, while on vacation in 1864 with former U.S. President Franklin Pierce, died in Plymouth at the second Pemigewasset House, which was later destroyed by fire in 1909. In the early 20th century, the Draper and Maynard Sporting Goods Company (D&M) sold products directly to the Boston Red Sox, and players such as Babe Ruth would regularly visit to pick out their equipment. The Plymouth Normal School was founded in 1871 out of the already existing Holmes Plymouth Academy, becoming the state's first teachers' college. It would later evolve into Plymouth Teachers' College in 1939, Plymouth State College in 1963, and finally Plymouth State University in 2003.

Geography 

Plymouth is drained by the Pemigewasset River and its tributary, the Baker River, and lies within the Merrimack River watershed. Plymouth Mountain, at  the highest point in Plymouth, is in the south, and the slopes of Tenney Mountain are in the west. (The  summit of Tenney Mountain lies to the west in the town of Groton.)

Climate

According to the Köppen Climate Classification system, Plymouth has a warm-summer humid continental climate, abbreviated "Dfb" on climate maps.

Demographics 

As of the census of 2010, there were 6,990 people, 1,953 households, and 947 families residing in the town. The population density was 248.8 people per square mile (96.0/km2). There were 2,231 housing units at an average density of 30.6 units/km2 (79.4 units/sq mi). The racial makeup of the town was 95.6% White, 1.0% African American, 0.3% Native American, 1.1% Asian, 0.5% some other race, and 1.6% from two or more races. Of the population 1.9% were Hispanic or Latino of any race.

There were 1,953 households, out of which 24.1% had children under the age of 18 living with them, 37.1% were headed by married couples living together, 8.6% had a female householder whose husband did not live with her, and 50.1% were non-families. 28.6% of all households were made up of individuals, and 9.9% were someone living alone who was 65 years of age or older. The average household size was 2.41, and the average family size was 2.89.

In the town, the population was spread out, with 12.0% under the age of 18, 50.4% from 18 to 24, 13.3% from 25 to 44, 16.3% from 45 to 64, and 8.0% who were 65 years of age or older. The median age was 21.7 years. For every 100 females, there were 109.2 males.  For every 100 females age 18 and over, there were 108.6 males.

For the period 2009–2013, the estimated median annual income for a household in the town was $41,709, and the median income for a family was $79,453. Male full-time workers had a median income of $52,297 versus $28,851 for females. The per capita income for the town was $19,804. 22.5% of the population and 3.3% of families were below the poverty line. Out of the total people living in poverty, 4.3% were under the age of 18 and 9.8% were 65 or older.

Recreation 
 Fox Pond Park
 Langdon Park and Walking Trails
 Walter-Newton Natural Area
 Sutherland Hiking Trail (on Plymouth Mountain)
 Plymouth Skate Park
 Quincy Bog
 Livermore Falls Hiking and River Jump

Sites of interest 
 Boy Scout Fountain on the Common (one of only two Boy Scout Fountains in the USA)
 The Flying Monkey Movie House and Performance Center (formerly the Plymouth Theater)
 Fox Park
 Lamson Library at Plymouth State University
 Pease Public Library
 Plymouth Historical Museum
 Russell House (oldest standing residential building in the town; now Plymouth State Admissions)
 Smith Millennium Bridge (a covered bridge over the Baker River)

Government

Town government and officials

Plymouth is governed in the traditional New England style, with a five-member board of selectmen as its executive branch, and the traditional town meeting as its legislative branch. Municipal elections and town meetings are customarily held in March.

Local, state and federal officials

Plymouth, like all other towns in New Hampshire, elects official representatives at the county, state and federal levels. These officials represent the various jurisdictions in which the town of Plymouth lies, and none of them represent the town exclusively. Each official is elected in his or her own district. Currently, Plymouth is situated in New Hampshire's 2nd congressional district, the State House of Representatives Grafton County District 8, State Senate District 2, and Executive Council District 1.

Notable people 

 William F. Batchelder (1926–2019), New Hampshire Supreme Court associate justice
 Henry W. Blair (1834–1920), US senator, congressman
 Eliza Coupe (born 1981), actress (Happy Endings, Scrubs)
 Irene Clark Durrell (1852–1914), educator
 William A. Fletcher (1788–1852), Chief Justice of the Michigan Supreme Court, born in Plymouth
 Robert Frost (1874–1963), poet
 Harl Pease (1917–1942), World War II pilot, Medal of Honor recipient
 Daniel Webster (1782–1852), US senator, congressman from Massachusetts

References

External links

 
 Plymouth Historical Society
 New Hampshire Economic and Labor Market Information Bureau Profile

 
1763 establishments in New Hampshire
Towns in Grafton County, New Hampshire
Towns in New Hampshire